Elias Salupeto Pena (died 2 November 1992) served as the representative of The National Union for the Total Independence of Angola (UNITA), an anti-Communist rebel group that fought against The People's Movement for the Liberation of Angola (MPLA) in the Angolan Civil War, to the Joint Military and Political Commission. Pena was a distant relative of UNITA leader Jonas Savimbi and a senior advisor to Savimbi.

Death
The government killed Pena along with Jeremias Chitunda, the Vice President of UNITA, in Luanda in November 1992 following the first round of the presidential election in what was known as the Halloween Massacre.

See also
List of unsolved murders

References

1990s murders in Angola
1992 crimes in Angola
1992 deaths
1992 murders in Africa
Angolan anti-communists
Angolan politicians
Angolan rebels
Assassinated Angolan politicians
Deaths by firearm in Angola
People of the Angolan Civil War
People murdered in Angola
UNITA politicians
Unsolved murders in Angola
Year of birth missing